The 2020 season was Jeonbuk Hyundai Motors' 28th season in the K-League in South Korea. Jeonbuk Hyundai Motors is competing K League, Korean FA Cup and AFC Champions League. Jeonbuk is a defending champions of 2019 K-Keague. K League was supposed to kick off on February 29, however, due to the coronavirus, it is not yet clear when to kick off, on May 6, the Korean Football Association announced on May 8, match will be played behind the closed doors.

Current squad

Transfer

In

Loan in

Out

Loan out

Coaching staff

Competition

Overall

Results summary

Results by round

League table

Matches

K League 1

Korean FA Cup

Jeonbuk Hyundai Motors won by 3-2 aggregate.

AFC Champions League

Group stage

Statistics

Appearances
Statistics accurate as of match played 8 May 2020

Top scorers

Assists

Clean sheets
The list is sorted by shirt number when total clean sheets are equal.

References

South Korean football clubs 2020 season
Jeonbuk Hyundai Motors seasons